Gavshaleh may refer to:
 Gavshaleh, Divandarreh
 Gavshaleh, Saqqez